Flavobacterium anatoliense  is a Gram-negative, rod-shaped and strictly aerobic bacterium from the genus of Flavobacterium which has been isolated from fresh water from Trabzon in Turkey.

References

External links
Type strain of Flavobacterium anatoliense at BacDive -  the Bacterial Diversity Metadatabase

 

anatoliense
Bacteria described in 2013